Idel may refer to:

Moshe Idel, historian and philosopher of Jewish mysticism (born 1947)
Atil or Itil, the ancient capital of Khazaria
Itil (river), also Idel, Atil, Atal, the ancient and modern Turkic name of the river Volga
Ivel, Iran, a village in Mazandaran Province

See also 
 Idle (disambiguation)
 Idol (disambiguation)